The Campeche spiny-tailed iguana (Cachryx alfredschmidti) is a species of lizard in the family Iguanidae. The species is native to southeastern Mexico and adjacent Guatemala.

Etymology
The specific name, alfredschmidti, is in honor of German herpetoculturist Alfred Schmidt.

Description
Adult males of C. alfredschmidti reach at least  and females  in snout-to-vent length (SVL). Tail length varies from 74 % to 85% SVL.

Geographic range
C. alfredschmidti was thought to be endemic to southern Campeche in Mexico. However, in 2003, this species was also recorded by a scientific expedition to the Mirador-Río Azul National Park in the Petén Department in Northern Guatemala. This was the first record in Guatemala's herpetofauna for this species.

Habitat
The natural habitat of C. alfredschmidti is tropical moist lowland forest and seasonally flooded scrub forest.

Behavior
C. alfredschmidti is arboreal. It can find safety in hollow branches and tree trunks, blocking the entrance with its spiny tail.

Diet
Fecal samples suggests that the diet of C. alfredschmidti consists of leaves, though it probably will eat arthropods too.

Reproduction
C. alfredschmidti is oviparous.

Conservation status
C. alfredschmidti is potentially threatened by habitat loss and degradation. The Guatemalan population was found in the Mirador-Río Azul National Park.

References

Further reading
Malone CL, Reynoso VH, Buckley L (2017). "Never judge an iguana by its spines: Systematics of the Yucatan spiny tailed [sic] iguana, Ctenosaura defensor (Cope, 1866)". Molecular Phylogenetics and Evolution 115: 27–39. (Cachryx alfredschmidti, new combination).
Morales-Mávil JE, Bello-Sánchez EA, Corona-López CR (2016). "Distribution and Natural History of the Campeche Spiny-tailed Iguanas [sic] (Ctenosaura alfredschmidti)". Herpetological Conservation and Biology 11 (Monograph 6): 168–176. (in English, with an abstract in Spanish).

Cachryx
Reptiles of Guatemala
Reptiles of Mexico
Reptiles described in 1995
Taxa named by Gunther Köhler
Taxonomy articles created by Polbot
Taxobox binomials not recognized by IUCN